Darkhan-Uul (literally Blacksmith Mountain) is one of the 21 aimags (provinces) of Mongolia. It is located in the north of the country.

History 

The city Darkhan was founded on October 17, 1961, as a second industrial center to reduce the migration pressure on the capital Ulaanbaatar. To do so, the existing sum (district) of the same name was dissolved, and its territory managed by the city authorities.

The Darkhan-Uul aimag with its four sum was carved out of the Selenge aimag in 1994.

Economy 
Darkhan is the second largest industrial center of Mongolia.
Darkhan Metallurgical Plant is one of the largest. There is also ThermoPower Plant in Darkhan that has capacity of 48 MW/h.

The aimag basically serves to support the city.

Transport 
Darkhan is the point where the side line to Erdenet forks off the main line of the Trans-Mongolian Railway.

Agriculture 
Darkhan Uul Aimag is situated in the agricultural heartland of Mongolia and it is a major agricultural producer in Mongolia with rich resources for agricultural development. This area, located at a low altitude, has a warmer climate than the rest of the country. In the Kharaa River basin there are favorable natural climatic conditions for the cultivation of cereals, vegetables, and especially potatoes. There are 35 agricultural companies and co-operatives in Darkhan Uul Aimag. This area contains 30,000 hectares of soil suitable for arable farming and 1287.8 thousand hectares for vegetable farming. Despite the development of the urban economy, local people continue to keep livestock. There are approximately 130,000 head of livestock in the province.

Administrative subdivisions 

* - urban settlement

References 

 
Provinces of Mongolia
States and territories established in 1994
1994 establishments in Mongolia
Enclaves and exclaves